Barry Lamar Bonds (born July 24, 1964) is an American former professional baseball left fielder who played 22 seasons in Major League Baseball (MLB). He was a member of the Pittsburgh Pirates from 1986 to 1992 and the San Francisco Giants from 1993 to 2007. Recognized as an all-around player and a prolific home run hitter, Bonds is considered to be one of the greatest baseball players of all time.

Bonds received a record seven National League Most Valuable Player Awards and 12 Silver Slugger Awards, along with 14 All-Star selections. He holds many MLB hitting records, including most career home runs (762), most home runs in a single season (73, set in 2001), and most career walks. Bonds led MLB in on-base plus slugging six times and placed within the top five hitters in 12 of his 17 qualifying seasons. For his defensive play in the outfield, he won eight Gold Glove Awards. He also had 514 stolen bases, becoming the first and only MLB player to date with at least 500 home runs and 500 stolen bases. Bonds is ranked second in career Wins Above Replacement among all major league position players by both Fangraphs and Baseball-Reference.com, behind only Babe Ruth.

Despite his accolades, Bonds led a controversial career, notably as a central figure in baseball's steroids scandal. He was indicted in 2007 on charges of perjury and obstruction of justice for allegedly lying to a grand jury during the federal government's investigation of BALCO, a manufacturer of an undetectable steroid. After the perjury charges were dropped, Bonds was convicted of obstruction of justice in 2011, but the conviction was overturned in 2015. During his 10 years of eligibility, he did not receive the 75% of the vote needed to be elected to the National Baseball Hall of Fame. Some voters of the Baseball Writers' Association of America (BBWAA) stated they did not vote for Bonds because he used performance-enhancing drugs.

Early life
Bonds was born in Riverside, California to Patricia (née Howard) and former major leaguer Bobby Bonds, and grew up in San Carlos and attended Junípero Serra High School in San Mateo, where he excelled in baseball, basketball, and football. He played on the junior varsity team during his freshman year and on the varsity team for the remainder of his high school career. He garnered a .467 batting average his senior year, and was named prep All-American. The Giants drafted Bonds in the second round of the 1982 MLB draft as a high school senior, but the Giants and Bonds were unable to agree on contract terms when Tom Haller's maximum offer was $70,000 ($ today) and Bonds's minimum to go pro was $75,000, so Bonds instead decided to attend college.

College career
Bonds attended Arizona State University, hitting .347 with 45 home runs and 175 runs batted in (RBI). In 1984 he batted .360 and had 30 stolen bases. In 1985, he hit 23 home runs with 66 RBIs and a .368 batting average. He was a Sporting News All-American selection that year. He tied the NCAA record with seven consecutive hits in the College World Series as sophomore and was named to All-Time College World Series Team in 1996.

Bonds was not well-liked by his Sun Devil teammates, in part because in the words of longtime coach Jim Brock, he was "rude, inconsiderate and self-centered." When he was suspended for breaking curfew, the other players initially voted against his return even though he was easily the best player on the team.

He graduated from Arizona State in 1986 with a degree in criminology. He was named ASU On Deck Circle Most Valuable Player; other winners include Dustin Pedroia, Willie Bloomquist, Paul Lo Duca, and Ike Davis. During college, he played part of one summer in the amateur Alaska Baseball League with the Alaska Goldpanners.

Professional career

Draft and minor leagues
The Pittsburgh Pirates drafted Bonds as the sixth overall pick of the 1985 Major League Baseball draft. He joined the Prince William Pirates of the Carolina League and was named July 1985 Player of the Month for the league. In 1986, he hit .311 in 44 games for the Hawaii Islanders of the Pacific Coast League.

Pittsburgh Pirates (1986–1992)
Before Bonds made it to the major leagues in Pittsburgh, Pirate fan attendance was low, with 1984 and 1985 attendance below 10,000 per game for the 81-game home schedule, with attendance woes being a combination of the economic problems of Western Pennsylvania in the early 1980s as well as the Pittsburgh drug trials that directly affected the Pirates going from World Series champions to nearly relocating to Denver in only six years. Bonds made his major league debut on May 30, 1986. In 1986, Bonds led National League (NL) rookies with 16 home runs, 48 RBI, 36 stolen bases and 65 walks, but he finished 6th in Rookie of the Year voting. He played center field in 1986, but switched to left field with the arrival of centerfielder Andy Van Slyke in 1987.

In his early years, Bonds batted as the leadoff hitter. With Van Slyke also in the outfield, the Pirates had a venerable defensive tandem that worked together to cover a lot of ground on the field although they were not close off the field. The Pirates experienced a surge in fan enthusiasm with Bonds on the team and set the club attendance record of 52,119 in the 1987 home opener. That year, he hit 25 home runs in his second season, along with 32 stolen bases and 59 RBIs.

Bonds improved in 1988, hitting .283 with 24 home runs. The Pirates broke the record set the previous year with 54,089 attending the home opener. Bonds now fit into a highly respected lineup featuring Bobby Bonilla, Van Slyke and Jay Bell. He finished with 19 homers, 58 RBIs, and 14 outfield assists in 1989, which was second in the NL. Following the season, rumors that he would be traded to the Los Angeles Dodgers for Jeff Hamilton and John Wetteland, but the team denied the rumors and no such trade occurred.

Bonds won his first MVP Award in 1990, hitting .301 with 33 home runs and 114 RBIs. He also stole 52 bases, which were third in the league, to become a first-time member of the 30–30 club. He won his first Gold Glove Award and Silver Slugger Award. That year, the Pirates won the National League East title for their first postseason berth since winning the 1979 World Series. However, the Cincinnati Reds, whose last post-season berth had also been in 1979 when they lost to the Pirates in that year's NLCS defeated the Pirates in the NLCS en route to winning the World Championship.

In 1991, Bonds also put up great numbers, hitting 25 homers and driving in 116 runs, and obtained another Gold Glove and Silver Slugger. He finished second to the Atlanta Braves' Terry Pendleton (the NL batting champion) in the MVP voting. 

In March 1992, Pirates general manager Ted Simmons agreed to a deal with Atlanta Braves counterpart John Schuerholz to trade Bonds, in exchange for Alejandro Peña, Keith Mitchell, and a player to be named later. Pirates manager Jim Leyland opposed the trade vehemently, and the proposal was rescinded. Bonds stayed with Pittsburgh and won his second MVP award that season. While hitting .311 with 34 homers and 103 RBIs, he propelled the Pirates to their third straight National League East division title. However, Pittsburgh was defeated by the Braves in a seven-game National League Championship Series. Bonds participated in the final play of Game 7 of the NLCS, whereby he fielded a base hit by Francisco Cabrera and attempted to throw out Sid Bream at home plate. But the throw to Pirates catcher Mike LaValliere was late and Bream scored the winning run. For the third consecutive season, the NL East Champion Pirates were denied a trip to the World Series. Following the loss, Bonds and star teammate Doug Drabek were expected to command salaries too high for Pittsburgh to again sign them.

Bonds was never well-liked by reporters or fans while in Pittsburgh, despite winning two MVP awards. One paper even gave him an "award" as the "MDP" (Most Despised Pirate).

San Francisco Giants (1993–2007)

1993 season
In 1993, Bonds left the Pirates to sign a lucrative free agent contract worth a then-record $43.75 million (equivalent to $ million in ) over six years with the Giants, with whom his father had spent the first seven years of his career, and with whom his godfather Willie Mays played 22 of his 24 Major League seasons. The deal was at that time the largest in baseball history, in terms of both total value and average annual salary.

Once he signed with the Giants, Bonds had intended to wear the number 24, his number during most of his stay with the Pirates and, after receiving Mays's blessing, the Giants were willing to unretire it until the public commotion from fans and media became too much. To honor his father, Bonds switched his jersey number to 25, as it had been Bobby's number in San Francisco.

In an emotional press conference announcing the signing, Bonds described joining the Giants as going "home" and following in the footsteps of his father and godfather as "unbelievable" and "a boyhood dream come true."

Bonds hit .336 in 1993, leading the league with 46 home runs and 123 RBI en route to his second consecutive MVP award, and third overall. As good as the Giants were (winning 103 games), the Atlanta Braves won 104 in what some call the last great pennant race (because the wild card was instituted the year after).

1994 season
In the strike-shortened season of 1994, Bonds hit .312 with 37 home runs and a league-leading 74 walks, and he finished 4th in MVP voting.

1995 season
In 1995, Bonds hit 33 homers and drove in 104 runs, hitting .294 but finished only 12th in MVP voting. In 1994, he appeared in a small role as himself in the television film Jane's House, starring James Woods and Anne Archer.

1996 season

In 1996, Bonds became the first National League player and second major league player (of the current list of four) to hit 40 home runs and steal 40 bases in the same season. The other members of the 40–40 club are José Canseco (1988), Alex Rodriguez (1998), and Alfonso Soriano (2006). His father Bobby Bonds was one home run short in 1973 when he hit 39 home runs and stole 43 bases.

Bonds hit his 300th and 301st home runs off the Florida Marlins' John Burkett on April 27. He became the fourth player in history to join the 300–300 club with 300 stolen bases and 300 home runs for a career, joining Willie Mays, Andre Dawson, and his father. Bonds's totals for the season included 129 runs driven in, a .308 average and a then-National League record 151 walks. He finished fifth in the MVP balloting.

1997 season
In 1997, Bonds hit .291, his lowest average since 1989. He hit 40 home runs for the second straight year and drove in 101 runs, leading the league in walks again with 145. He also stole 37 bases, tying his father for having the most 30–30 seasons (5), and he again placed fifth in the MVP balloting.

1998 season
With two outs in the 9th inning of a game against the Arizona Diamondbacks on May 28, 1998, Bonds became only the fifth player in baseball history to be given an intentional walk with the bases loaded. Nap Lajoie (1901), Del Bissonette (1928) and Bill Nicholson (1944) were three others in the 20th century who received that rare honor. The first to receive one was Abner Dalrymple in 1881.

On August 23, Bonds hit his 400th career home run. By doing so, he became the first player ever to enter the 400–400 club by having career totals of 400 home runs and 400 stolen bases; he is still the only player to have achieved this feat. The milestone home run came off Kirt Ojala, who, like Burkett, was pitching for the Marlins. For the season, he hit .303 with 37 home runs and drove in 122 runs, winning his eighth Gold Glove, He finished 8th in the MVP voting.

1999 season

1999 marked a career-low, up to that point, for Bonds in terms of playing time. Bonds started off the 1999 season hitting well by batting .366 in the month of April with 4 home runs and 12 RBIs in the Giants' first 12 games of the season. But on April 18 he was placed on the 15-day disabled list for only the 2nd time in his career up to that point. Bonds had suffered a torn tendon in his biceps as well as bone spurs in his elbow, both of which required surgery and cost him the rest of April and all of May.

Upon returning to action on June 9, Bonds struggled somewhat at the plate for the remainder of the 1999 season. A series of nagging injuries including elbow pain, knee inflammation and groin issues hampered his play. Only hitting .248 after his return from the disabled list, he still managed to slug 34 home runs, drive in 83 runs as well as hit for a .617 slugging percentage, despite missing nearly two full months with injuries and only playing in 102 games.

Bill James ranked Bonds as the best player of the 1990s. He added that the decade's second-best player, Craig Biggio, had been closer in production to the decade's 10th-best player than to Bonds. In 1999, with statistics through 1997 being considered, Bonds ranked Number 34 on The Sporting News' list of the 100 Greatest Baseball Players, making him the highest-ranking active player.

When the Sporting News list was redone in 2005, Bonds was ranked 6th behind Babe Ruth, Willie Mays, Ty Cobb, Walter Johnson, and Hank Aaron. Bonds was omitted from 1999's Major League Baseball All-Century Team, to which Ken Griffey Jr. was elected. James wrote of Bonds, "Certainly the most unappreciated superstar of my lifetime. ... Griffey has always been more popular, but Bonds has been a far, far greater player." In 1999, he rated Bonds as the 16th-best player of all time. "When people begin to take in all of his accomplishments", he predicted, "Bonds may well be rated among the five greatest players in the history of the game."

2000 season
In 2000, the following year, Bonds hit .306 with career bests through that time in both slugging percentage (.688) and home runs (49) in just 143 games. He also drew a league-leading 117 walks.

2001 season
The next year, Bonds's offensive production reached even higher levels, breaking not only his own personal records but several major league records. In the Giants' first 50 games in 2001, he hit 28 home runs, including 17 in May—a career high. This early stretch included his 500th home run hit on April 17 against Terry Adams of the Los Angeles Dodgers. He also hit 39 home runs by the All-star break (a major league record), drew a major league record 177 walks, and had a .515 on-base average, a feat not seen since Mickey Mantle and Ted Williams over forty years earlier. Bonds' slugging percentage was a major league record .863 (411 total bases in 476 at-bats), and he ended the season with a major league record 73 home runs.

On October 4, by homering off Wilfredo Rodríguez in the 159th game of the season, Bonds tied the previous record of 70 set by Mark McGwire—which McGwire set in the 162nd game in 1998. He then hit numbers 71 and 72 the following night off Chan Ho Park. Bonds added his 73rd off Dennis Springer on October 7. The ball was later sold to toy manufacturer Todd McFarlane for $450,000. He previously bought Mark McGwire's 70th home run ball from 1998. Bonds received the Babe Ruth Home Run Award for leading MLB in home runs that season.

2002 season
Bonds re-signed with the Giants for a five-year, $90 million contract in January 2002. He hit five home runs in the Giants' first four games of the season, tying Lou Brock's 35-year record for most home runs after four games. He won the NL batting title with a career-high .370 average and struck out only 47 times. He hit 46 home runs in 403 at-bats.

Despite playing in nine fewer games than the previous season, he drew 198 walks, a major-league record; 68 of them were intentional walks, surpassing Willie McCovey's 45 in 1969 for another Major League record. He slugged .799, then the fourth-highest total all time. Bonds broke Ted Williams' major league record for on-base average with .582. Bonds also hit his 600th home run, less than a year and a half after hitting his 500th. The home run came on August 9 at home against Kip Wells of the Pirates.

2002 postseason
Bonds batted .322 with eight home runs, 16 RBI, and 27 walks in the postseason en route to the 2002 World Series, which the Giants lost 4–3 to the Anaheim Angels.

2003 season
In 2003, Bonds played in just 130 games. He hit 45 home runs in just 390 at-bats, along with a .341 batting average. He slugged .749, walked 148 times, and had an on-base average well over .500 (.529) for the third straight year. He also became the only member of the career 500 home run/500 stolen base club by stealing second base on June 23 off of pitcher Éric Gagné in the 11th inning of a tied ball game against the Los Angeles Dodgers (against whom Bonds had tallied his 500th home run). Bonds scored the game-winning run later that inning.

2004 season
In 2004, Bonds had perhaps his best season. He hit .362 en route to his second National League batting title, and broke his own record by walking 232 times. He slugged .812, which was fourth-highest of all time, and broke his on-base percentage record with a .609 average. Bonds passed Mays on the career home run list by hitting his 661st off of Ben Ford on April 13. He then hit his 700th off of Jake Peavy on September 17. Bonds hit 45 home runs in 373 at-bats, and struck out just 41 times, putting himself in elite company, as few major leaguers have ever had more home runs than strikeouts in a season. Bonds would win his fourth consecutive MVP award and his seventh overall. His seven MVP awards are four more than any other player in history. In addition, no other player from either league has been awarded the MVP four times in a row. (The MVP award was first given in 1931). The 40-year-old Bonds also broke Willie Stargell's 25-year record as the oldest player to win a Most Valuable Player Award (Stargell, at 39 years, 8 months, was National League co-MVP with Keith Hernandez in 1979). On July 4, he tied and passed Rickey Henderson's career bases on balls record with his 2190th and 2191st career walks.

As Bonds neared Aaron's record, Aaron was called on for his opinion of Bonds. He clarified that he was a fan and admirer of Bonds and avoided the controversy regarding whether the record should be denoted with an asterisk for Bonds's alleged steroid usage. He felt recognition and respect for the award was something to be determined by the fans. As the steroid controversy received greater media attention during the offseason before the 2005 season, Aaron expressed some reservations about the statements Bonds made on the issue. Aaron expressed that he felt drug and steroid use to boost athletic performance was inappropriate. Aaron was frustrated that the media could not focus on events that occurred in the field of play and wished drugs or gambling allegations such as those associated with Pete Rose could be emphasized less. In 2007, Aaron felt the whole steroid use issue was very controversial and decided that he would not attend any possible record-breaking games. Aaron congratulated Bonds through the media including a video played on the scoreboard when Bonds eventually broke Aaron's record in August 2007.

2005 season
Bonds's salary for the 2005 season was $22 million, the second-highest salary in Major League Baseball (the Yankees' Alex Rodriguez earned the highest, $25.2 million).
Bonds endured a knee injury, multiple surgeries, and rehabilitation. He was activated on September 12 and started in left field. In his return against the San Diego Padres, he nearly hit a home run in his first at-bat. Bonds finished the night 1-for-4. Upon his return, Bonds resumed his high-caliber performance at the plate, hitting home runs in four consecutive games from September 18 to 21 and finishing with five homers in only 14 games.

2006 season

In 2006, Bonds earned $20 million (not including bonuses), the fourth-highest salary in baseball. Through the 2006 season he had earned approximately $172 million during his then 21-year career, making him baseball's all-time highest-paid player. Bonds hit under .200 for his first 10 games of the season and did not hit a home run until April 22. This 10-game stretch was his longest home run slump since the 1998 season. On May 7, Bonds drew within one home run of tying Babe Ruth for second place on the all-time list, hitting his 713th career home run into the second level of Citizens Bank Park in Philadelphia, off pitcher Jon Lieber in a game in which the Giants lost to the Philadelphia Phillies. The towering home run—one of the longest in Citizens Bank Park's two-season history, traveling an estimated 450 feet (140 m)—hit off the facade of the third deck in right field.

On May 20, Bonds hit his 714th career home run to deep right field to lead off the top of the 2nd inning, tying Ruth for second all-time. The home run came off left-handed pitcher Brad Halsey of the Oakland A's, in an interleague game played in Oakland, California. Since this was an interleague game at an American League stadium, Bonds was batting as the designated hitter in the lineup for the Giants. Bonds was quoted after the game as being "glad it's over with" and stated that more attention could be focused on Albert Pujols, who was on a very rapid home run pace in early 2006.

On May 28, Bonds passed Ruth, hitting his 715th career home run to center field off Colorado Rockies pitcher Byung-hyun Kim. The ball was hit an estimated 445 feet (140 m) into center field where it went through the hands of several fans but then fell onto an elevated platform in center field. Then it rolled off the platform where Andrew Morbitzer, a 38-year-old San Francisco resident, caught the ball while he was in line at a concession stand. Mysteriously, radio broadcaster Dave Flemming's radio play-by-play of the home run went silent just as the ball was hit, apparently from a microphone failure. But the televised version, called by Giants broadcaster Duane Kuiper, was not affected.

On September 22, Bonds tied Henry Aaron's National League career home run record of 733. The home run came in the top of the 6th inning of a high-scoring game against the Milwaukee Brewers, at Miller Park in Milwaukee, Wisconsin. The achievement was notable for its occurrence in the very city where Aaron began (with the Milwaukee Braves) and concluded (with the Brewers, then in the American League) his career. With the Giants trailing 10–8, Bonds hit a blast to deep center field on a 2–0 pitch off the Brewers' Chris Spurling with runners on first and second and one out. Though the Giants were at the time clinging to only a slim chance of making the playoffs, Bonds's home run provided the additional drama of giving the Giants an 11–10 lead late in a critical game in the final days of a pennant race. The Brewers eventually won the game, 13–12, though Bonds went 3-for-5, with two doubles, the record-tying home run, and six runs batted in.

On September 23, Bonds surpassed Aaron for the NL career home run record. Hit in Milwaukee like the previous one, this was a solo home run off Chris Capuano of the Brewers. This was the last home run Bonds hit in 2006. In 2006, Bonds recorded his lowest slugging percentage (a statistic that he had historically ranked among league leaders season after season) since 1991 with the Pittsburgh Pirates.

In January 2007, the New York Daily News reported that Bonds had tested positive for amphetamines. Under baseball's amphetamine policy, which had been in effect for one season, players testing positive were to submit to six additional tests and undergo treatment and counseling. The policy also stated that players were not to be identified for a first positive test, but the New York Daily News leaked the test's results. When the Players Association informed Bonds of the test results, he initially attributed it to a substance he had taken from the locker of Giants teammate Mark Sweeney, but would later retract this claim and publicly apologize to Sweeney.

2007 season

On January 29, 2007, the Giants finalized a contract with Bonds for the 2007 season. After the commissioner's office rejected Bonds's one-year, $15.8 million deal because it contained a personal-appearance provision, the team sent revised documents to his agent, Jeff Borris, who stated that "At this time, Barry is not signing the new documents." Bonds signed a revised one-year, $15.8 million contract on February 15 and reported to the Giants' Spring training camp on time.

Bonds resumed his march to the all-time record early in the 2007 season. In the season opener on April 3, all he had was a first-inning single past third base with the infield shifted right, immediately followed by a stolen base and then thrown out at home on a baserunning mistake, followed by a deep fly-out to left field, late in the game. Bonds regrouped the next day with his first at-bat in the second game of the season at the Giants' AT&T Park. Bonds hit a pitch from Chris Young of the San Diego Padres just over the wall to the left of straight-away center field for career home run 735. This home run put Bonds past the midway point between Ruth and Aaron.

Bonds did not homer again until April 13, when he hit two (736 and 737) in a 3 -or-3 night that included 4 RBI against the Pittsburgh Pirates. Bonds splashed a pitch by St. Louis Cardinals pitcher Ryan Franklin into McCovey Cove on April 18 for home run 738. Home runs number 739 and 740 came in back to back games on April 21 and 22 against the Arizona Diamondbacks.

The hype surrounding Bonds's pursuit of the home run record escalated on May 14. On this day, Sports Auction for Heritage (a Dallas-based auction house) offered US$1 million to the fan who would catch Bonds's record-breaking 756th-career home run. The million-dollar offer was rescinded on June 11 out of concern of fan safety. Home run 748 came on Father's Day, June 17, in the final game of a three-game road series against the Boston Red Sox at Fenway Park, where Bonds had never previously played. With this homer, Fenway Park became the 36th major league ballpark in which Bonds had hit a home run. He hit a Tim Wakefield knuckleball just over the low fence into the Giant's bullpen in right field. It was his first home run off his former Pittsburgh Pirate teammate, who became the 441st different pitcher to surrender a four-bagger to Bonds. The 750th career home run, hit on June 29, also came off a former teammate: Liván Hernández. The blast came in the 8th inning and at that point tied the game at 3–3.

On July 19, after a 21 at-bat hitless streak, Bonds hit two home runs, numbers 752 and 753, against the Chicago Cubs. He went 3-for-3 with two home runs, six RBIs, and a walk on that day. The struggling last-place Giants still lost the game, 9–8. On July 27, Bonds hit home run 754 against Florida Marlins pitcher Rick VandenHurk. Bonds was then walked his next four at-bats in the game, but a two-run shot helped the Giants win the game 12–10. It marked the first time since he had hit #747 that Bonds had homered in a game the Giants won. On August 4, Bonds hit a 382 foot (116 m) home run against Clay Hensley of the San Diego Padres for home run number 755, tying Hank Aaron's all-time record. Bonds greeted his son, Nikolai, with an extended bear hug after crossing home plate. Bonds greeted his teammates and then his wife, Liz Watson, and daughter Aisha Lynn behind the backstop. Hensley was the 445th different pitcher to give up a home run to Bonds. Ironically, given the cloud of suspicion that surrounded Bonds, the tying home run was hit off a pitcher who had been suspended by baseball in 2005 for steroid use. He was walked in his next at-bat and eventually scored on a fielder's choice.

On August 7 at 8:51 PM PDT, at Oracle Park (then known as AT&T Park) in San Francisco, Bonds hit a 435 foot (133 m) home run, his 756th, off a pitch from Mike Bacsik of the Washington Nationals, breaking the all-time career home run record, formerly held by Hank Aaron. Coincidentally, Bacsik's father had faced Aaron (as a pitcher for the Texas Rangers) after Aaron had hit his 755th home run. On August 23, 1976, Michael J. Bacsik held Aaron to a single and a fly out to right field. The younger Bacsik commented later, "If my dad had been gracious enough to let Hank Aaron hit a home run, we both would have given up 756." After hitting the home run, Bonds gave Bacsik an autographed bat.

The pitch, the seventh of the at-bat, was a 3–2 pitch which Bonds hit into the right-center field bleachers. The fan who ended up with the ball, 22-year-old Matt Murphy from Queens, New York City, (and a Mets fan), was promptly protected and escorted away from the mayhem by a group of San Francisco police officers. After Bonds finished his home run trot, a 10-minute delay followed, including a brief video by Aaron congratulating Bonds on breaking the record Aaron had held for 33 years, and expressing the hope that "the achievement of this record will inspire others to chase their own dreams". Bonds made an impromptu emotional statement on the field, with Willie Mays, his godfather, at his side and thanked his teammates, family and his late father. Bonds sat out the rest of the game.

The commissioner, Bud Selig, was not in attendance in this game but was represented by the Executive Vice President of Baseball Operations, Jimmie Lee Solomon. Selig called Bonds later that night to congratulate him on breaking the record. President George W. Bush also called Bonds the next day to congratulate him. On August 24, San Francisco honored and celebrated Bonds' career accomplishments and breaking the home run record with a large rally in Justin Herman Plaza. The rally included video messages from Lou Brock, Ernie Banks, Ozzie Smith, Joe Montana, Wayne Gretzky and Michael Jordan. Speeches were made by Willie Mays, Giants teammates Omar Vizquel and Rich Aurilia, and Giants owner Peter Magowan. Mayor Gavin Newsom presented Bonds the key to the City and County of San Francisco and Giants vice president Larry Baer gave Bonds the home plate he touched after hitting his 756th career home run.

The record-setting ball was consigned to an auction house on August 21. Bidding began on August 28 and closed with a winning bid of US$752,467 on September 15 after a three-phase online auction. The high bidder, fashion designer Marc Ecko, created a website to let fans decide its fate. Subsequently, Ben Padnos, who submitted the $186,750 winning bid on Bonds' record-tying 755th home run ball also set up a website to let fans decide its fate. Ten million voters helped Ecko decide to brand the ball with an asterisk and send it to the National Baseball Hall of Fame and Museum. Of Ecko's plans, Bonds said "He spent $750,000 on the ball and that's what he's doing with it? What he's doing is stupid." Padnos, on the other hand, sold five-year ads on a website, www.endthedebate.com, where people voted by a two-to-one margin to smash the ball.

Bonds concluded the 2007 season with a .276 batting average, 28 home runs, and 66 RBIs in 126 games and 340 at-bats. At the age of 43, he led both leagues in walks with 132.

Post-playing career
On September 21, 2007, the San Francisco Giants confirmed that they would not re-sign Bonds for the 2008 season. The story was first announced on Bonds' own website earlier that day. Bonds officially filed for free agency on October 29, 2007. His agent Jeff Borris said: "I'm anticipating widespread interest from every Major League team."

There was much speculation before the 2008 season about where Bonds might play. However, no one signed him during the 2008 or 2009 seasons. If he had returned to Major League Baseball, Bonds would have been within close range of several significant hitting milestones, needing just 65 hits to reach 3,000, four runs batted in to reach 2,000, and 38 home runs to reach 800. He would have needed 69 more runs scored to move past Rickey Henderson as the all-time runs champion, and 37 extra base hits to move past Hank Aaron as the all-time extra base hits champion.

As of November 13, 2009, Borris maintained that Bonds was still not retired. On December 9, however, Borris told the San Francisco Chronicle that Bonds had played his last major league game. Bonds announced on April 11, 2010, that he was proud of McGwire for admitting his use of steroids. Bonds said that it was not the time to retire, but he noted that he was not in shape to play immediately if an interested club called him. In May 2015, Bonds filed a grievance against Major League Baseball through the players' union arguing that the league colluded in not signing him after the 2007 season. In August 2015, an arbitrator ruled in favor of MLB and against Bonds in his collusion case.

On December 15, 2011, Bonds was sentenced to 30 days of house arrest, two years of probation and 250 hours of community service, for an obstruction of justice conviction stemming from a grand jury appearance in 2003. However, U.S. District Judge Susan Illston then delayed the sentence pending an appeal. In 2013 his conviction was upheld on appeal by a three judge panel of the United States Court of Appeals for the Ninth Circuit. However, the full court later granted Bonds an en banc rehearing, and on April 22, 2015, an 11-judge panel of the Ninth Circuit voted 10–1 to overturn his conviction.

On March 10, 2014, Bonds began a seven-day stint as a roving spring training instructor for the Giants. On December 4, 2015, he was announced as the new hitting coach for the Miami Marlins, but was relieved of his duties on October 3, 2016, after just one season. He followed up with a public thank-you letter, acknowledging owner Jeffrey Loria, and the opportunity as "one of the most rewarding experiences of my baseball career." In 2017, Bonds officially re-joined the Giants organization as a special advisor to the CEO. On July 8, 2017, Bonds was added to the Giants Wall of Fame.

On February 6, 2018, the San Francisco Giants announced their intentions to retire his number 25 jersey, which happened on August 11, 2018. His number 24 with the Pirates remains in circulation, most prominently worn by Brian Giles from 1999 to 2003 and by Pedro Alvarez from 2011 to 2015.

National Baseball Hall of Fame consideration
In his ten years of eligibility for the National Baseball Hall of Fame, Bonds fell short of the 75% of the votes from the Baseball Writers' Association of America (BBWAA) needed for induction. His vote percentages from 2013 through 2022 were: 36.2%, 34.7%, 36.8%, 44.3%, 53.8%, 56.4%, 59.1%, 60.7%, 61.8% and 66%. He appeared on 260 of 394 ballots in his last year.

Despite falling off the ballot, Bonds remained eligible through the Hall of Fame's Today's Game Committee, a committee composed of 16 members of the National Baseball Hall of Fame, executives, and veteran media members. (hence the nickname of "veterans' committee") who consider retired players who lost ballot eligibility while still having made notable contributions to baseball from 1986 to 2016. The vote was held in December 2022; twelve of the sixteen votes were required for induction, but Bonds received fewer than four.

Public persona
During his playing career, Bonds was frequently described as a difficult person, surly, standoffish and ungrateful. In a 2016 interview with Terence Moore, he said he regretted the persona he had created. He attributed it to a response to the pressure he felt to perform as a young player with the Pirates. Remarked Bonds,

Bonds reports that for a short time during his playing days with the Giants he changed his demeanor at the behest of a group of teammates, smiling much more frequently and engaging more with others with a pleasant attitude. Shortly thereafter, Bonds says, in the midst of a slump, the same group of teammates pleaded that he revert, having seemingly lost his competitive edge, and causing the team to lose more. In spite of his protest that they would not appreciate the results, his teammates insisted. Bonds says he complied, maintaining that familiar standoffish edge the rest of his playing career.

On May 9, 1996, Bonds shoved USA Today journalist Rod Beaton in the team's clubhouse. As Beaton was waiting to interview Robby Thompson one hour before a game against the St. Louis Cardinals, Bonds told Beaton to leave. The reporter replied that Major League Baseball rules allowed him 15 minutes more to talk with players. Bonds waved a finger in Beaton's face and shoved him in the chest, after which members of the team's coaching staff and front office interceded. Bonds and Beaton spoke again after the game. Beaton later said, "He accused me of having an attitude" and "I told him he went over the line by shoving me, but there was no apology". Bonds felt that the incident was overblown and said that, "We don't have a problem. We like each other. It was a big joke. He just got whacked out." Beaton filed no formal complaint about the incident, but USA Today filed a grievance with the team.

Controversies

BALCO scandal

Since 2003, Bonds has been a key figure in the Bay Area Laboratory Co-operative (BALCO) scandal. BALCO marketed tetrahydrogestrinone ("the Clear"), a performance-enhancing anabolic steroid that was undetectable by doping tests. He was under investigation by a federal grand jury regarding his testimony in the BALCO case, and was indicted on perjury and obstruction of justice charges on November 15, 2007. The indictment alleges that Bonds lied while under oath about his alleged use of steroids.

In 2003, BALCO's Greg Anderson, Bonds's trainer since 2000, was indicted by a federal grand jury in the United States District Court for the Northern District of California and charged with supplying anabolic steroids to athletes, including a number of baseball players. This led to speculation that Bonds had used performance-enhancing drugs during a time when there was no mandatory testing in Major League Baseball. Bonds declared his innocence, attributing his changed physique and increased power to a strict regimen of bodybuilding, diet, and legitimate supplements.

During grand jury testimony on December 4, 2003, Bonds said that he used a clear substance and a cream that he received from his personal strength trainer, Greg Anderson, who told him they were the nutritional supplement flaxseed oil and a rubbing balm for arthritis. Later reports on Bonds's leaked grand-jury testimony contend that he admitted to unknowingly using "the cream" and "the clear".

In July 2005, all four defendants in the BALCO steroid scandal trial, including Anderson, struck deals with federal prosecutors that did not require them to reveal names of athletes who might have used banned drugs.

Perjury case

On November 15, 2007, a federal grand jury indicted Bonds on four counts of perjury and one count of obstruction of justice as it relates to the government investigation of BALCO. He was tried in the U.S. District Court for the Northern District of California. On February 14, 2008, a typo in court papers filed by Federal prosecutors erroneously alleged that Bonds tested positive for steroids in November 2001, a month after hitting his record 73rd home run. The reference was meant instead to refer to a November 2000 test that had already been disclosed and previously reported. The typo sparked a brief media frenzy. His trial for obstruction of justice was to have begun on March 2, 2009, but jury selection was postponed by emergency appeals by the prosecution. The trial commenced on March 21, 2011, with Judge Susan Illston presiding. He was convicted on April 13, 2011, on the obstruction of justice charge, for giving an evasive answer to a question under oath. On December 15, 2011, Bonds was found guilty for an obstruction of justice conviction stemming from a grand jury appearance in 2003. However, U.S. District Judge Susan Illston then delayed the sentence pending his appeal. He was sentenced to 30 days of house arrest. He also received two years of probation and was ordered to perform 250 hours of community service.

Bonds appealed his conviction to the U.S. Court of Appeals for the Ninth Circuit. In 2013, a three-judge panel of the Ninth Circuit affirmed his conviction, but in 2015 his appeal was reheard by the full court en banc, which voted 10–1 to overturn his conviction.

Player's union licensing withdrawal 

In 2003, Bonds withdrew from the MLB Players Association (MLBPA) licensing agreement because he felt independent marketing deals would be more lucrative for him. Bonds is the first player in the 30-year history of the licensing program not to sign. Because of this withdrawal, his name and likeness are not usable in any merchandise licensed by the MLBPA. In order to use his name or likeness, a company must deal directly with Bonds. For this reason, he does not appear in some baseball video games, forcing game-makers to create generic athletes as replacements. These generic video games replacements tended to be caucasian and sometimes had different handedness which was done likely to avoid potential player likeness lawsuits from Bonds.

Game of Shadows

In March 2006 the book Game of Shadows, written by Lance Williams and Mark Fainaru-Wada, was released amid a storm of media publicity including the cover of Sports Illustrated. Initially small excerpts of the book were released by the authors in the issue of Sports Illustrated. The book alleges Bonds used stanozolol and a host of other steroids, and is perhaps most responsible for the change in public opinion regarding Bonds's steroid use.

The book contained excerpts of grand jury testimony that is supposed to be sealed and confidential by law. The authors have been steadfast in their refusal to divulge their sources and at one point faced jail time. On February 14, 2007, Troy Ellerman, one of Victor Conte's lawyers, pleaded guilty to leaking grand jury testimony. Through the plea agreement, he will spend two and a half years in jail.

Love Me, Hate Me
In May 2006, former Sports Illustrated writer Jeff Pearlman released a revealing biography of Bonds entitled Love Me, Hate Me: Barry Bonds and the Making of an Anti-Hero. The book also contained many allegations against Bonds. The book, which describes Bonds as a polarizing insufferable braggart with a legendary ego and staggering ability, relied on over five hundred interviews, none with Bonds himself.

Bonds on Bonds

In April 2006 and May 2006, ESPN aired a few episodes of a 10-part reality TV (unscripted, documentary-style) series starring Bonds. The show, titled Bonds on Bonds, focused on Bonds's chase of Babe Ruth's and Hank Aaron's home run records. Some felt the show should be put on hiatus until baseball investigated Bonds's steroid use allegations. The series was canceled in June 2006, ESPN and producer Tollin/Robbins Productions citing "creative control" issues with Bonds and his representatives.

Personal life
Bonds met Susann ("Sun") Margreth Branco, the mother of his first two children (Nikolai and Shikari), in Montreal, Quebec, in August 1987. They eloped to Las Vegas February 5, 1988. The couple separated in June 1994, divorced in December 1994, and had their marriage annulled in 1997 by the Catholic Church. The divorce was a media affair because Bonds had his Swedish spouse sign a prenuptial agreement in which she "waived her right to a share of his present and future earnings" and which was upheld. Bonds had been providing his wife $20,000/month in child support and $10,000 in spousal support at the time of the ruling. During the hearings to set permanent support levels, allegations of abuse came from both parties. The trial dragged on for months, but Bonds was awarded both houses and reduced support. On August 21, 2000, the Supreme Court of California, in an opinion signed by Chief Justice Ronald M. George, unanimously held that "substantial evidence supports the determination of the trial court that the [prenuptial] agreement in the present case was entered into voluntarily." In reaction to the decision, significant changes in California law relating to the validity and enforceability of premarital agreements soon followed.

In 2010, Bonds's son Nikolai, who served as a Giants batboy during his father's years playing in San Francisco and always sat next to his dad in the dugout during games, was charged with five misdemeanors resulting from a confrontation with his mother, Sun Bonds, who was granted a restraining order against Nikolai. 

In 1994, Bonds and Kimberly Bell, a graphic designer, started a relationship that lasted from 1994 through May 2003. Bonds purchased a home in Scottsdale, Arizona, for Kimberly.

On January 10, 1998, Bonds married his second wife, Liz Watson, at the San Francisco Ritz-Carlton Hotel in front of 240 guests. The couple lived in Los Altos Hills, California, with their daughter Aisha during their ten-and-a-half years of marriage before Watson filed for legal separation on June 9, 2009, citing irreconcilable differences. On July 21, 2009, just six weeks later, Watson announced that she was withdrawing her Legal Separation action. The couple were reconciled for seven months before Watson formally filed for divorce in Los Angeles on February 26, 2010. On June 6, 2011, Bonds and Watson filed a legal agreement not to take the divorce to trial and instead settle it in an "uncontested manner", agreeing to end the marriage privately at an unspecified later date without further court involvement.

Several of Bonds's family and extended family members have been involved in athletics as either a career or a notable pastime. Bonds has a younger brother, Bobby Jr., who was also a professional baseball player. His paternal aunt, Rosie Bonds, is a former American record holder in the 80 meter hurdles, and competed in the 1964 Olympics. In addition, he is a distant cousin of Hall of Famer Reggie Jackson.

Among Bonds's many real estate properties is a home he owns in the exclusive gated community of Beverly Park in Beverly Hills, California.

An avid cyclist, Bonds chose the activity to be a primary means of keeping in shape and great passion since his playing career. Because knee surgeries, back surgeries, and hip surgeries made it much more difficult to run, cycling has allowed him to engage in sufficient cardiovascular activity to help keep in shape. As a result of the cycling, he has lost 25 pounds from his final playing weight of 240 pounds.

Career distinctions

Besides holding Major League career records in home runs (762), walks (2,558), and intentional walks (688), at the time of his retirement, Bonds also led all active players in RBI (1,996), on-base percentage (.444), runs (2,227), games (2,986), extra-base hits (1,440), at-bats per home run (12.92), and total bases (5,976). He is 2nd in doubles (601), slugging percentage (.607), stolen bases (514), at-bats (9,847), and hits (2,935), 6th in triples (77), 8th in sacrifice flies (91), and 9th in strikeouts (1,539), through September 26, 2007.

Bonds is the lone member of the 500–500 club, which means he has hit at least 500 home runs (762) and stolen at least 500 bases (514); no other player has even 400 of both. He is also one of only four baseball players all-time to be in the 40–40 club (1996), which means he hit 40 home runs (42) and stole 40 bases (40) in the same season; the other members are José Canseco, Alex Rodriguez, and Alfonso Soriano.

Records held

 Home runs in a single season (73), 2001
 Home runs in a career (762)
 Home runs since turning 40 years old (74)
 Home runs in the year he turned 43 years old (28)
 Consecutive seasons with 30 or more home runs (13), 1992–2004
 Slugging percentage in a single season (.863), 2001
 Slugging percentage in a World Series (1.294), 2002
 Consecutive seasons with .600 slugging percentage or higher (8), 1998–2005
 On-base percentage in a single season (.609), 2004
 Walks in a single season (232), 2004
 Intentional walks in a single season (120), 2004
 Consecutive games with a walk (18)
 Consecutive games with an intentional walk (6)
MVP awards (7—closest competitors trail with 3), 1990, 1992–93, 2001–2004
 Consecutive MVP awards (4), 2001–2004
 National League Player of the Month selections (13) (2nd place, either league, Frank Thomas, 8; 2nd place, N.L., George Foster, Pete Rose, and Dale Murphy, 6)
 Oldest player (age 38) to win the National League batting title (.370) for the first time, 2002
 Putouts as a left fielder (5,226)
 Career games with at least one home run and one stolen base (102)

Records shared
 Consecutive plate appearances with a walk (7)
 Consecutive plate appearances reaching base (15)
 Tied with his father, Bobby, for most seasons with 30 home runs and 30 stolen bases (5); they are the only father-son members of the 30–30 club
 Home runs in a single postseason (8), 2002

Other accomplishments

Awards and distinctions

 Five-time SF Giants Player of the Year (1998, 2001–2004)
 Three-time NL Hank Aaron Award winner (2001–02, 2004)
 Listed at #6 on The Sporting News list of the 100 Greatest Baseball Players, the highest-ranked active player, in 2005.
 Named a finalist to the Major League Baseball All-Century Team in 1999, but not elected to the team in the fan balloting.
 Rating of 340 on Baseball-Reference.com's Hall of Fame monitor (100 is a good HOF candidate); 10th among all hitters, highest among eligible hitters not in HOF yet.
 Only the second player to twice have a single-season slugging percentage over .800, with his record .863 in 2001 and .812 in 2004. Babe Ruth was the other, with .847 in 1920 and .846 in 1921.
 Became the first player in history with more times on base (376) than official at-bats (373) in 2004. This was due to the record number of walks, which count as a time on base and as a plate appearance, but not an at-bat. He had 135 hits, 232 walks, and 9 hit-by-pitches for the 376 number.
Tenth all-time in plate appearances with 12,606. He is the only player in the top ten of this category to not obtain 3,000 hits and just one of two players with as many as 12,000 plate appearances to not do so (the other being Omar Vizquel). 
 With his father Bobby (332, 461), leads all father-son combinations in combined home runs (1,094) and stolen bases (975), respectively through September 26, 2007.
 Played minor league baseball in both Alaska and Hawaii. In 1983, he played for the Alaska Goldpanners of Fairbanks in the Alaska Baseball League, and in 1986, he played for the Hawaii Islanders in the Pacific Coast League.
Featured on the cover of Sports Illustrated. He has appeared as the main subject on the cover eight times in total; seven with the Giants and once with the Pirates. He has also appeared in an inset on the cover twice. He was the most recent Pirate player to appear on the cover, until Jason Grilli was featured in SIs edition of July 22, 2013.

See also

 50 home run club
 500 home run club
 List of Major League Baseball annual runs batted in leaders
 List of Major League Baseball annual home run leaders
 List of Major League Baseball annual runs scored leaders
 List of Major League Baseball batting champions
 List of Major League Baseball career at-bat leaders
 List of Major League Baseball career bases on balls leaders
 List of Major League Baseball career doubles leaders
 List of Major League Baseball career extra base hits leaders
 List of Major League Baseball career games played leaders
 List of Major League Baseball career hits leaders
 List of Major League Baseball career hit by pitch leaders
 List of Major League Baseball career home run leaders
 List of Major League Baseball career on-base percentage leaders
 List of Major League Baseball career OPS leaders
 List of Major League Baseball career plate appearance leaders
 List of Major League Baseball career records
 List of Major League Baseball career runs batted in leaders
 List of Major League Baseball career runs scored leaders
 List of Major League Baseball career slugging percentage leaders
 List of Major League Baseball career stolen bases leaders
 List of Major League Baseball career strikeouts by batters leaders
 List of Major League Baseball career total bases leaders
 List of Major League Baseball doubles records
 List of Major League Baseball home run records
 List of Major League Baseball individual streaks
 List of Major League Baseball progressive career home runs leaders
 List of Major League Baseball progressive single-season home run leaders
 List of Major League Baseball record breakers by season
 List of Major League Baseball record holders
 List of Major League Baseball runs batted in records
 List of Major League Baseball runs records
 List of Major League Baseball single-season records
 List of milestone home runs by Barry Bonds
 List of second-generation Major League Baseball players
 List of Major League Baseball players named in the Mitchell Report
 Major League Baseball titles leaders
 Popov v. Hayashi

References

External links

Barry Bonds at SABR (Baseball BioProject)
Barry Bonds at Baseball Almanac
Barry Bonds at Pura Pelota (Venezuelan Professional Baseball League)
Barry Bonds 

Bonds archive at Los Angeles Times

 
 

 
 

|-

|-

 
1964 births
Living people
African-American baseball coaches
African-American baseball players
American sportspeople convicted of crimes
American sportspeople in doping cases
Arizona State Sun Devils baseball players
Baseball coaches from California
Baseball players from Riverside, California
Doping cases in baseball
Gold Glove Award winners
Hawaii Islanders players
Major League Baseball hitting coaches
Major League Baseball left fielders
Major League Baseball players with retired numbers
Miami Marlins coaches
National League Most Valuable Player Award winners
National League All-Stars
National League batting champions
National League home run champions
National League RBI champions
Navegantes del Magallanes players
American expatriate baseball players in Venezuela
People from San Carlos, California
People from Los Altos Hills, California
Pittsburgh Pirates players
Prince William Pirates players
San Francisco Giants players
Silver Slugger Award winners
Sportspeople from Riverside, California
Sportspeople from the San Francisco Bay Area
Junípero Serra High School (San Mateo, California) alumni
Alaska Goldpanners of Fairbanks players